Muros may refer to:
Muros, A Coruña, a municipality in the province of A Coruña in the autonomous community of Galicia, Spain
Muros, Sardinia, a comune in the province of Sassari in the region Sardini, Italy
Muros (comarca), a comarca in the Province of A Coruña, Galicia, Spain
Muros de Nalón, a municipality in the autonomous community of Asturias, Spain
Muros de Nalón (parish), a parish in the municipality if Muros de Nalón, Asturias, Spain
Muros (Encantadia), a fictional character from the Philippine telefantasyes Encantadia and Etheria
Cuernavaca#Museo Muros, an art museum in Cuernavaca, Mexico

See also
Muro (disambiguation)
Muras (disambiguation)